The Fordham Road–190th Street station was an express station on the demolished IRT Third Avenue Line in the Bronx, New York City. It was located at Fordham Road and Third Avenue, one block east of Webster Avenue, in the modern location of Fordham Plaza. Opened in 1901, the station was closed in 1973 and demolished in 1977 along with the rest of the Third Avenue Line. No trace of the station exists today.

History

An extension of the Third Avenue El to Fordham Square (now Fordham Plaza) was proposed in 1894. The station opened on July 1, 1901, as part of a three station extension of the line north of Tremont Avenue–177th Street. It was originally called Pelham Avenue, the former name of Fordham Road and Pelham Parkway. It served as a major transfer point to what is today the Metro-North Railroad's Harlem and New Haven Lines at the Fordham station, and St. John's College (now the main Rose Hill campus of Fordham University). This station served as the terminus of the line until May 21, 1902, when it was extended to Bronx Park Terminal. Between 1913 and 1916 under the Dual Contracts, a third track was added to the line to facilitate express service. Express service began on January 17, 1916. A second extension to Gun Hill Road along Webster Avenue was also built during the Dual Contracts, opening in 1920.

The station had three tracks and two island platforms, situated on the west side of Third Avenue. North of the station, the mainline curved from Third Avenue onto Webster Avenue, while the stub line towards Bronx Park ran along the western edge of the Fordham campus parallel to the Metro-North tracks. The split occurred at an at-grade junction at about East 194th Street. The next local stop to the north was either Bronx Park (closed in 1951) or 200th Street. The next express stop to the north was the terminus of the line at Gun Hill Road. The next stop to the south was 183rd Street for local trains and Tremont Avenue–177th Street for express trains.

In the 1970s, the city planned to close the elevated line, which was dilapidated and blamed for blight and ills in the borough. The station closed on April 29, 1973. The structure was demolished by 1977. Service to the station and along the Third Avenue corridor was replaced by Bx55 buses.

Current status
From 1973 to 2013, the Bx55 limited bus replaced elevated service between The Hub and Gun Hill Road. In 2013, the Bx55 was eliminated, replaced by the Bx15 limited bus which terminates at Fordham Plaza. Service to Gun Hill Road is provided by the Bx41 Select Bus Service route along Webster Avenue.

Currently, the station site is occupied by Fordham Plaza, a major bus hub and commercial center. While the plaza has existed in some form since the 1910s, the current plaza was constructed in the mid-1990s, and has been undergoing reconstruction since 2014. The closest subway stop to the former station is Fordham Road on the IND Concourse Line six blocks west.

References

External links

IRT Third Avenue Line stations
Railway stations in the United States opened in 1901
Railway stations closed in 1973
Former elevated and subway stations in the Bronx
1901 establishments in New York City
1973 disestablishments in New York (state)
Fordham, Bronx
Third Avenue